Jesse Hardin Little (born April 15, 1997) is an American former professional stock car racing driver. He last competed part-time in the NASCAR Xfinity Series driving the No. 34 Chevrolet Camaro for Jesse Iwuji Motorsports and part-time in the NASCAR Camping World Truck Series, driving the No. 02 and 20 Chevrolet Silverado for Young's Motorsports. He is the son of former NASCAR driver Chad Little. He and his father as well as Jason Little (Jesse's uncle and Chad's brother) previously owned a Truck, East and West Series team, which was known as Team Little Racing and then JJL Motorsports, from 2012 to 2019.

Racing career

Early career
A native of Sherrills Ford, North Carolina and a third-generation racer, Little began his racing career in quarter midgets at the age of 7, moving up to Bandoleros in 2007 and Legends cars in 2009. He won the 2010 USAC Eastern Focus Young Guns midget car championship, and in 2011 competed in the UARA Stars late model series.

NASCAR
Little made his debut in NASCAR competition at the age of 15, competing in seven K&N Pro Series East events in 2012; driving a family-owned No. 97 Chevrolet, he was the youngest driver ever to start a race in the series. He returned to the K&N Pro Series East full-time in 2013, driving for Coulter Motorsports; he finished in the top 10 eight times on his way to the series' Rookie of the Year award. He returned to K&N East competition again in 2014, winning his first race at New Hampshire. Little raced in the K&N East series on a part-time basis in 2015, winning at Iowa Speedway with Hattori Racing Enterprises.

In 2015, he added a limited schedule in the Camping World Truck Series in a partnership with ThorSport Racing.

In 2016, he joined his uncle's Truck Series team, JJL Motorsports. He made two attempts in the fall races at Texas and Homestead finishing 20th and 18th respectively.

In 2017, Little and JJL returned, running 4 races. The first one was at Dover, where he finished 14th. He then finished a season-best 8th in Iowa. Little next raced at Bristol, continuing his strong performance, finishing 13th. His last start of 2017 came in Phoenix, where he was involved in a late-race crash, finishing 18th.

In 2018, Little expanded his schedule to 9 races. He finished with six top tens, the highest finish a 6th at Iowa, his best finish to date in the Truck Series. In July 2018, Little joined Premium Motorsports for his Monster Energy NASCAR Cup Series debut in the Quaker State 400 at Kentucky Speedway, driving the No. 7 Chevrolet Camaro ZL1 and finishing 35th. Little later joined Gaunt Brothers Racing at Bristol, also finishing 35th.

In 2019, Little increased his Truck schedule again, planning to run 12 to 15 races in the newly renamed Gander Outdoors Truck Series.

On November 7, 2019, JD Motorsports announced Little would race full-time for the team in the NASCAR Xfinity Series starting in 2020. Little finished 19th in points with two top-ten finishes.

Little moved to B. J. McLeod Motorsports' No. 78 for the 2021 season. He lost his ride with McLeod's team to Josh Williams in 2022. On December 22, it was announced that Little would drive for Young's Motorsports in the Truck Series for at least 12 races with the No. 02, splitting with Kaz Grala. Little also ran a one-off Xfinity event at Phoenix, replacing Jesse Iwuji, whom was at his military duties.

On September 14, 2022, Little announced that he would retire from NASCAR after the 2022 UNOH 200 at Bristol.

Personal life
He is the son of former NASCAR driver Chad Little. They are not related to NASCAR on Fox pit reporter Jamie Little.

Motorsports career results

NASCAR
(key) (Bold – Pole position awarded by qualifying time. Italics – Pole position earned by points standings or practice time. * – Most laps led.)

Monster Energy Cup Series

Xfinity Series

Camping World Truck Series

K&N Pro Series East

K&N Pro Series West

 Season still in progress 
 Ineligible for series points

References

External links
 
 

Living people
1997 births
People from Sherrills Ford, North Carolina
Racing drivers from North Carolina
NASCAR drivers